Charley Valera (born 22 October 1957) is an American author. He has chronicled World War II stories as told first-hand by the soldiers, sailors and airmen that participated. His first book was "My Father's War: Memories from Our Honored WWII Soldiers". Valera's second publication was "A Military Mustang: The Extraordinary Life of Captain John W. Arens"

During the Pandemic of 2020, Valera teamed up with rock 'n roll's premier Lighting Director, Cosmo Wilson. Together they have chronicled the continued memoirs from Cosmo Wilson's more than 40 years in the music industry. Lighting for millions of fans, such artists as AC/DC, Aerosmith, Foreigner, Rolling Stones and dozens more.

Valera is a pilot and aviation enthusiast has been invited to speak on topics of his books  and aviation. Valera is also an affiliate Gulf Coast Writers Association in Southwest Florida.

Valera assisted with the four-time Emmy awarded special with host Nick Emmons on Reflect on D-Day 75 Years Later on NBC 

He has hosted a TV mini-series program that discusses WWII veterans life stories.

The 80 minute documentary, "Memories from our Honored WWll Soldiers" has earned the prestigious Accolade Global Film Competition Award for November 2018.

Valera also volunteers his time a pilot, Field Director and Media Relations for Aerobridge.org. A non-profit association consisting of general aviation pilots that deliver specifically needed immediate supplies to areas devastated by natural disasters.

References 
https://www.news-press.com/videos/news/local/2018/11/30/charley-valeras-my-fathers-war-tells-stories-wwii-soldiers/2161822002/ Video of Valera from The News-Press taken at SW Florida Military Museum and Library, Cape Coral, FL.
https://www.wellsvilledaily.com/videos/embed/2161822002/?placement=mobileweb-amp&cst=news&series=news&keywords=

https://www.wpri.com/rhode-show/my-fathers-war/amp/

1957 births
Living people
War writers
21st-century American writers